Brothers is a 1929 German silent drama film directed by Werner Hochbaum. The film was shot on location in the dockyards of Hamburg using a mainly amateur cast. Hochbaum was closely associated with the Social Democratic Party at the time and made several films portraying working class conditions.

Partial cast
 Gyula Balogh as Der Sohn
 Erna Schumacher as Die alte Mutter
 Ilse Berger

References

Bibliography

External links

1929 films
Films of the Weimar Republic
German silent feature films
Films directed by Werner Hochbaum
Films set in Hamburg
Films shot in Hamburg
Films about the labor movement
German black-and-white films
German drama films
1929 drama films
Silent drama films
1920s German films